Raymond McDaniel (born in Florida) is an American poet, author of four poetry collections, all published by Coffee House Press: The Cataracts (2018), Special Powers and Abilities (2013), Saltwater Empire (2008), and Murder (a Violet) (2004). Murder (a Violet) was a National Poetry Series winner selected by Anselm Hollo. He graduated from University of Michigan in 1995, with an MFA. He teaches at the University of Michigan, and writes book reviews for The Constant Critic.

Published works
Full-Length Poetry Collections

References

External links
 Poem: The Poetry Foundation > Assault to Abjury by Raymond McDaniel
 Audio Poetry Reading: University of Michigan > Michigan Today > June 2006 > Three Poem by Raymond McDaniel
 Audio Poetry Reading: From the Fishouse > Raymond McDaniel Reading His Poems
 Audio Poetry Reading: Poetry Everywhere > PBS > WGBH > Assault to Abjury by Raymond McDaniel
 Feature: The Ann Arbor News > June 16, 2008 > WHO Is: Raymond McDaniel - Poet and University of Michigan Instructor by Jordan Miller
 Interview: Kicking Wind > July 7, 2006 > Raymond McDaniel Interview
 Criticism: 
 Criticism: 

American male poets
University of Michigan alumni
University of Michigan faculty
Year of birth missing (living people)
Living people
Poets from Michigan
Poets from Florida